is a passenger railway station on the New Shuttle (Ina Line) located in Ōmiya-ku, Saitama, Japan, operated by the Saitama New Urban Transit Company.

Lines 

Station layout
This elevated station consists of two opposed side platforms serving two tracks, located on either side of the elevated Shinkansen lines. The station building is located underneath the platforms.

Platforms

History
On 14 October 2007, it was renamed Tetsudō-Hakubutsukan Station coinciding with opening of the nearby Railway Museum.

Passenger statistics
In fiscal 2016, the station was used by an average of 4568 passengers daily (boarding passengers only).

Surrounding area
 Railway Museum
 
 Kita-Ōmiya Station (Tōbu Urban Park Line)

See also
 List of railway stations in Japan

References

External links

  

Railway stations in Japan opened in 1983
Railway stations in Saitama (city)